Champions League Super Strikes Updates are football trading cards produced by Panini for the football season 09/10. They are based upon the teams in the Champions League. Single packets of six cards retail for 50p in Britain, and a starter pack is also available. In all there are 150 cards in this Super Strikes collection for the 09/10 season. There is an original collection, Champions League Super Strikes which contains 350 cards.

Types of Cards 

There are 5 types of cards in the Super Strikes collection. First, there are base cards (with no special appearance), Star Players (with a shiny foil look), Goal Stoppers (with a similar face to that of the Star Players), Fans' Favorites (with a glossy background) and Champions, the rarest type of cards with gold writing and a gloss background. Available with special products such as the starter pack are Limited Editions.

Trading cards